Mali-400 MP is a Mali series GPU produced by ARM Holdings.

Is one of the world's most shipped mobile GPUs across multiple platforms. It was the first Mali GPU to offer multi-core implementation. The Mali-400 GPU scaled from 1–4 cores and was the world’s first OpenGL ES 2.0 conformant multi core GPU. Focusing on reduced power and bandwidth consumption, the Mali-400 GPU was selected for reduced cost devices.

There are several versions, the MP1 and the MP4, the most common and used, is the quad-core version, "Multi-core" also called "Mali-400 MP4" with frequencies ranging from 210 Mhz to 500 Mhz, develop respectively 12 Gigaflops and 18 Gigaflops of computing power. Semiconductors are manufactured by ARM Holdings, and ARM ASIC partner licenses. The core is mainly developed by ARM, at the former Falanx company.

It is the world's first OpenGL ES 2.0-compliant multi-core GPU capable of delivering 2D and 3D acceleration with performance up to 1080p resolution.

It is a pure 3D engine that renders the graphics in memory and passes the rendered image onto another core which manages the display. ARM provides the tools necessary to create OpenGL ES shaders exact names: Mali GPU Shader Development Studio and Mali GPU Engine User Interface. It is mounted on various System-on-a-chip (SoC) including: the Samsung Galaxy S2, Samsung Galaxy S3.

Specifications

References

Graphics processing units